David Jonathan Heyman (born 26 July 1961) is a British film producer and the founder of Heyday Films. Heyman secured the rights to the Harry Potter film series in 1999 and went on to produce all eight installments of the franchise. He also received three Academy Award nominations for his work on the films Gravity, Once Upon a Time in Hollywood, and Marriage Story.

Early life
Heyman was born in London. He is the son of John Heyman, producer of the films The Go-Between and Jesus, and Norma Heyman (née Pownall), an actress, and Oscar-nominated producer of the films Dangerous Liaisons and Mrs Henderson Presents. His paternal grandparents were German Jews who left Nazi Germany and emigrated to England prior to World War II, while his mother's family was English. At age seven, he was a page boy in the wedding of his godmother, Diana Dors, to actor Alan Lake. Heyman went to Westminster School and, following graduation, he decided to study abroad. He earned a degree in art history from Harvard University in 1983., where he was an All-American sabreman for the fencing team.

Career
Heyman started in the film industry as a production assistant on David Lean's A Passage to India, and in 1986, Heyman became a creative executive at Warner Brothers, and he was assistant to Mark Canton. In 1987, he became vice president of United Artists, which joined a series of changes as original production VPs had quit, and subsequently embarked on an independent producing career with his first film, Juice, in 1992, followed by the cult "stoner" film The Stoned Age (1994) and others.

In 1997 Heyman returned to London and founded his own production company, Heyday Films. He has since produced a number of films including the Harry Potter film adaptations. Other notable productions during this time include the 2007 blockbuster I Am Legend and the 2008 films The Boy in the Striped Pyjamas, Is Anybody There?, and Yes Man.

After finishing work on the Harry Potter films, Heyman reunited with Harry Potter and the Prisoner of Azkaban director Alfonso Cuarón to produce the 2013 science fiction thriller Gravity, starring Sandra Bullock and George Clooney. The film grossed more than $700 million worldwide and was nominated for ten Academy Awards including Best Picture, winning seven including Best Director for Cuarón. He also produced the 2013 comedy We're the Millers and the 2014 family film Paddington, for which he was nominated for the Alexander Korda Award for Best British Film.

Heyman produced the Warner Bros. film adaptation of J. K. Rowling's Fantastic Beasts and Where to Find Them, which was released in November 2016, as well as its 2018 sequel. He is also set to produce Fables, based on the comic book series. He was announced as the producer of the fantasy film The Queen of the Tearling, starring Emma Watson and based on the novel written by Erika Johansen. Warner Bros. has acquired the film rights and will distribute the film.

Heyman is also currently developing projects with Potter director David Yates and has long been developing a film adaptation of Mark Haddon's 2003 novel The Curious Incident of the Dog in the Night-Time with Potter screenwriter Steve Kloves.

It was announced in 2016 that Heyman had partnered with China's Alibaba Pictures to produce a movie about Warriors, feral cats who have a complex social hierarchy and reside in a forest, originally written by Erin Hunter. In May 2018 it was announced that STX Entertainment had come on board to co-produce the Warriors film, with STX board member Gigi Pritzker working alongside Heyman. As of 2021, no director or release date has yet been announced for the film, and no information has been released since.

In 2020, he won the Golden Globe Award for Best Motion Picture – Musical or Comedy for Once Upon a Time in Hollywood with Quentin Tarantino, and both of them were nominated for an Academy Award for Best Picture. In addition, Heyman was also nominated for the same award for Marriage Story with Noah Baumbach.

Personal life
Heyman currently lives in Pimlico, London, and is married to interior designer Rose Uniacke (née Batstone). They have one son. He is the stepfather to her four children from her previous marriage to businessman and mathematician, Robie Uniacke, the partner of actress Rosamund Pike since 2009.

Filmography
He was a producer in all films unless otherwise noted.

Film

As an actor

Thanks

Television

Awards

References

External links
 
 Interview with David Heyman about The Boy In The Striped Pajamas and Harry Potter And The Half Blood Prince
 Boy in the Striped Pajamas Interview & Biographies
 Film Journal International: David Heyman Interview
 Interview with David Heyman about the Harry Potter series, Harry Potter and the Deathly Hallows, and his projects after the Harry Potter films end (Direct audio link to the interview)

1961 births
Living people
British people of English descent
British people of German-Jewish descent
Businesspeople from London
English film producers
Golden Globe Award-winning producers
Harvard University alumni
People educated at Westminster School, London